= T-54A =

T-54A may refer to:

- T-54A tank, a variant of the T-54 main battle tank
- Textron T-54A, a U.S. Navy version of the Beechcraft Super King Air 260 aircraft
